Te Matatini is a nationwide Māori performing arts festival and competition for kapa haka performers from all of New Zealand. The name was given by Professor Wharehuia Milroy, a composite of Te Mata meaning "the face" and tini denoting "many" — hence the meaning of Te Matatini is "many faces".

The Te Matatini festival is held every two years in different regions of New Zealand. Authority (mana) is given to different tribes (iwi) to host the festival. For example, in 2017 the mana was given to Te Whanganui-a-Tara on behalf of the Ngāti Kahungunu (Heretaunga) region.

Mead (2003) explains, Mana is undergone by a set of rules before it is given, the people or person in charge has to accept these constraints and strive to rise above them in order to do the job that is set before them.

Te Matatini is seen as playing a very important role within Māoridom in promoting the tikanga of the Māori culture and Kapa Haka. It provides a valuable experience for the people of New Zealand and others from all around the world, with the festival attracting up to 30,000 participants and spectators. Te Matatini celebrates the Māori culture, its beauty, and its core values. Kapa Haka is a form of Māori identity and contributes to New Zealand being unique.

The Te Matatini Society is the driving force behind Te Matatini National Kapa Haka Festival. Initially emerging in the late 1960s, it has evolved into the sponsor of a variety of Māori festivals and Polynesian events. The society in its current form was established in 1972 and has focused on the long term nurturing of Māori performing arts.

The next national kapa haka competition, Te Matatini 2025, will be held in Taranaki/Whanganui.

Schedule of events

Prizes
Prizes are awarded on the final competition day. Across the five days, each team are judged against set criteria, by expert judges, appointed from around New Zealand.
 The Tāonga (Trophies) are awarded to the teams with the highest score in the seven compulsory (Aggregate) and non-compulsory (non-aggregate) disciplines from the pool rounds.
 The Toa Whakaihuwaka (overall winner) taonga is awarded to the team with the highest scores from the final day (Te Matangirua) and also determines first second and third place.

Disciplines
The performances are made up of different disciplines, each Kapa Haka team are required to perform six disciplines within their performance piece - whakaeke (a choreographed entry), mōteatea (traditional chant), poi (light ball swung on the end of a rope), waiata-ā-ringa (action song), haka and whakawātea (exit).  They must perfect every discipline in a polished 25-minute performance.

Past winners

Footnotes

Further reading
 T. Karetu, Haka! The Dance of a Noble People. Auckland, NZ: Reed Books, 1993.
 R. Ngata and A. Armstrong, Maori Action Songs. Auckland, NZ: Reed Books, 2002.
 H. Mead, Tikanga Maori. Living by Maori Values. Wellington, NZ: Huia Publishers, 2003.
 A.W. Reed, Reed Book of Maori Mythology. Auckland, NZ: Reed Books, 2004.

External links
 Te Matatini official website.
 Te Matatini Society, History and Initiatives. Retrieved 20 March 2010.
 Te Matatini Society, Nga ture o te whakataetae: Competition rules. Retrieved from 25 March 2010.
 Kapa Haka Secondary Schools 2010.

Folk festivals in New Zealand
Dance festivals in New Zealand
Māori festivals